The Reverend James England Cotter, known simply as Jim Cotter, was an English Anglican priest, remembered for his religious poetry and his advocacy for gay and lesbian Christians.

Life & Ministry

He was born in Stockport, Manchester, in 1942 and was educated at Stockport Grammar School, before studying at Gonville and Caius College, Cambridge, later being ordained priest in the Diocese of Manchester.

In 1976 he was a founding member and the first general secretary of the Lesbian and Gay Christian Movement, or LGCM, later renamed OneBodyOneFaith. In this capacity, he appeared on the TV programme The Lord's My Shepherd and He Knows I'm Gay, speaking openly about his own sexuality and how it related to his spirituality and mental health.

Later, during his ministry in the Church in Wales, he received a reprimand from then-Archbishop of Wales the Rt Revd Dr Barry Morgan for conducting a same-sex blessing.  He took the opportunity to publish The Service of My Love, a pastoral and liturgical handbook for such occasions.

Cotter's final post was as vicar of St Hywyn's Church, Aberdaron, where his predecessor had been the Welsh poet R.S. Thomas, whom Cotter cited as an inspiration for his own work.

He was being cared for by friends when he died from leukaemia on 16 April, 2014, at his home in Llandudno.

Legacy

In his lifetime he published about 30 books and pamphlets, many through his own publishing company, Cairns, and many of his personal notes and diaries are now housed in the Jim Cotter Collection at Gladstone's Library in Hawarden, Wales. Several of his prayers and poems are included as alternative canticles in the prayer book of the Society of St Francis in Europe. 
 
The Jim Cotter Trust has funded CRC Online, a virtual resource for the St Mark's Centre for Radical Christianity, among other projects.

References

1942 births
2014 deaths